Events from the year 1885 in Sweden

Incumbents
 Monarch – Oscar II
 Prime Minister – Robert Themptander

Events
10 December 1885 – Härnösand becomes the first town in Sweden with electric street lighting, following the Gådeå power station being taken into use.
Date unknown - The newspapers Borlänge Tidning and Social-Demokraten are founded.
Date unknown - Creation of the Wahlström & Widstrand
Date unknown - Women are allowed to become members of the Swedish Publicists' Association, and 14 women are inducted as members. 
Date unknown - Johanna Hedén founded Göteborgs Barnmorskesällskap (The Gothenburg Midwifery Association), the first union for women in Sweden.
Date unknown - The governmental Girl School Committee of 1885 is established to reform female education: Sophie Adlersparre and Hilda Caselli are two of the members, making them the first female members of a government committee.

Births
 
 
 
 
 
 

13 January – Emil Johansson, tug of war competitor (died 1972).
14 January – Oskar Bengtsson, footballer (died 1972).
 15 January – Claës König, nobleman, military officer and horse rider (died 1961).
24 January – Åke Grönhagen, modern pentathlete and épée fencer (died 1974).
25 January – Ivan Törnmarck, sport shooter (died 1963).
26 January – Per Thorén, figure skater (died 1962).
28 January – Julia Cæsar, actress (died 1971).
6 February – John Klintberg, athlete (died 1955).
10 February – Gösta Ehrensvärd, Navy officer (died 1973).
12 February – Bror Meyer, speed skater.
27 February – Ellen Rydelius, journalist, author and translator (died 1957).
1 March – Gustaf Månsson, sailor (died 1976).
20 March – Karl Sundholm, rower (died 1965).
3 April – Alrik Sandberg, wrestler (died 1975).
 1 May – Knut Torell, gymnast (died 1966).
5 May – Albert Pettersson, weightlifter (died 1960).
7 May – Axel Johansson, rower (died 1973).
7 May – Gunnar Wingqvist, diver (died 1917).
13 May – Theodor Bergqvist, wrestler (died 1969).
19 May – Carl-Georg Andersson, wrestler (died 1961).
14 June – Arvid Åberg, hammer thrower (died 1950).
17 June – Karin Ek, writer (died 1926).
20 June – Brynolf Larsson, long-distance runner (died 1973).
21 June – Henning Möller, athlete (died 1968).
22 June – Karl Fryksdal, athlete (died 1945).
2 July – Anders Almqvist, rower (died 1915).
9 July – Tor Andræ, clergyman, professor, scholar of comparative religion and bishop (died 1947).
 16 July – Carl Jonsson, police officer, tug of war competitor, swimmer and author (died 1966).
29 July – Sigurd Lewerentz, architect (died 1975).
30 July – Carl Wilhelm Rubenson, mountaineer (d. 1960).
8 August – Charles Luther, sprinter (died 1962).
24 August – Ivar Ryberg, rower (died 1929).
28 August – Eskil Brodd, diver (died 1969).
30 August – Nils von Kantzow, gymnast (died 1967).
14 September – Lili Ziedner, actress (died 1939).
30 September – Frans Fast, tug of war competitor (died 1959).
4 October – Nils Häggström, modern pentathlete (died 1974).
9 October – Thor Ericsson, footballer (died 1975).
7 October – Nils Hellsten, gymnast (died 1963).
18 October – Gustaf Broberg, rower (died 1952).
23 October – Elna Montgomery, figure skater (died 1981).
25 October – Malcolm Svensson, track and field athlete (died 1961).
27 October – Sigrid Hjertén, painter (died 1948).
 28 October – Per Albin Hansson, politician, prime minister (died 1946).
29 October – Ivan Lamby, sailor (died 1970).
30 October – Leonard Peterson, gymnast (died 1956).
23 November – Hugo Björklund, wrestler (died 1963).
3 December – Gustaf Andersson, sport shooter (died 1969).
7 December – Theodor Nauman, water polo goalkeeper (died 1947).
8 December – Axel Lindahl, athlete (died 1959).
15 December – Jacob Westberg, long-distance runner (died 1933).
28 December – Carl-Gustaf Klerck, fencer (died 1976).
30 December – Artur Cederborgh, actor (died 1961).
30 December – Frank Martin, equestrian (died 1962).

Deaths

 1 January  - Pilt Carin Ersdotter, famed beauty (born 1814)
 27 January - Andreas Bruce, transsexual (born 1808)
 11 January  - Helga de la Brache, con artist (born 1817)
 7 February  - Betty Pettersson, first female university student (born 1838)

References

 
Years of the 19th century in Sweden
Sweden